Austria competed at the 2022 European Athletics Championships in Munich, Germany, between 15 and 21 August 2022

Results

Austria entered the following athletes.

Men
Track and road events

Field events

Women
Track and road events

Field events

Combined events – Heptathlon

References

External links
European Athletics Championships

2022
Nations at the 2022 European Athletics Championships
European Athletics Championships